Mexican Spanish is the variety of dialects and sociolects of the Spanish language spoken in the United Mexican States. Mexico has the largest number of Spanish speakers, with more than twice as many as in any other country in the world. Spanish is spoken by just over 99.2% of the population, being the mother tongue of 93.8% and the second language of 5.4%.

Variation 

The territory of contemporary Mexico is not coextensive with what might be termed Mexican Spanish, since linguistic boundaries rarely coincide with political ones. The Spanish spoken in the southernmost state of Chiapas, bordering Guatemala, resembles the variety of Central American Spanish spoken in that country, where  is used. Meanwhile, the Treaty of Guadalupe Hidalgo led to a large number of Mexicans residing in what had become US territory, and many of their descendants have continued to speak Spanish. In addition, the waves of 19th- and 20th-century migration from Mexico to the United States, have contributed greatly to making Mexican Spanish the most widely spoken variety of Spanish in the United States. Finally, the Spanish spoken in coastal areas often exhibits certain phonetic traits in common with the Caribbean rather than with that of central Mexico, and the Spanish of the Yucatán Peninsula is quite distinct from other varieties. It should also be noted that there is great variation in intonation patterns from region to region within Mexico. For instance, the Spanish of northern Mexico, including the traditional Spanish of New Mexico, is characterized by its own distinct set of intonation patterns.

Regarding the evolution of the Spanish spoken in Mexico, the Swedish linguist Bertil Malmberg points out that in Central Mexican Spanish—unlike most varieties in the other Spanish-speaking countries—the vowels lose strength, while consonants are fully pronounced. Malmberg attributes this to a Nahuatl substratum, as part of a broader cultural phenomenon that preserves aspects of indigenous culture through place names of Nahuatl origin, statues that commemorate Aztec rulers, etc. The Mexican linguist Juan M. Lope Blanch, however, finds similar weakening of vowels in regions of several other Spanish-speaking countries; he also finds no similarity between the vowel behavior of Nahuatl and that of Central Mexican Spanish; and thirdly, he finds Nahuatl syllable structure no more complex than that of Spanish. Furthermore, Nahuatl is not alone as a possible influence, as there are currently more than 90 native languages spoken in Mexico.

Phonology

Consonants

Affricates 

Some claim that in Mexican Spanish, the sequence  is really a single phoneme, the same as the lateral affricate of Nahuatl. They predicted that if  were a single segment, it would have been pronounced quicker than the other clusters.

Fricatives 
In addition to the usual voiceless fricatives of other American Spanish dialects, Mexican Spanish also has the palatal sibilant , mostly in words from indigenous languages—especially place names.

However, in some (but not all) dialects of southern Mexico, the normal articulation is glottal  (as it is in most dialects of the Caribbean, the Pacific Coast, the Canary Islands, and most of Andalusia and Extremadura in Spain).

All varieties of Mexican Spanish are characterized by yeísmo: the letters  and  correspond to the same phoneme, . That phoneme, in most variants of Mexican Spanish, is pronounced as either a palatal fricative  or an approximant  in most cases, although after a pause it is instead realized as an affricate .

Thus,  'house' and  'hunt' are homophones.

Present in most of the interior of Mexico is the preservation, or absence of debuccalization of syllable-final . The fact that the areas with the strongest preservation of final  are also those with the most frequent unstressed vowel reduction gives the sibilant  a special prominence in these dialects. On the other hand, -weakening is very frequent on the Pacific and Caribbean coasts, and is also fairly frequent in northern and northwestern Mexico, and in parts of Oaxaca and the Yucatan peninsula. In all these regions, -weakening acts as a sociolinguistic marker, being more prevalent in rural areas and among the lower classes. The prevalence of a weakened syllable-final  in so many peripheral areas of Mexico suggests that such weakening was at one point more prevalent in peripheral areas, but that the influence of Mexico City has led to the diffusion of a style of pronunciation without -weakening, especially among the urban middle classes.

-weakening on both the Pacific and the Gulf Coast was strengthened by influences from Andalusian, Canarian, and Caribbean Spanish dialects.

Also, the dialects spoken in rural Chihuahua, Sonora, and Sinaloa, like that of New Mexico, have developed aspiration of syllable-initial , as in words like  'to pass' and  'sir'.

Stops 
There is a set of voiced obstruents—, and sometimes —which alternate between approximant and plosive allophones depending on the environment.

Speakers from the Yucatan, especially men or those who are older, often pronounce the voiceless stops  with aspiration.

Vowels 

Like most Spanish dialects and varieties, Mexican Spanish has five vowels: close unrounded front , close rounded back , mid unrounded front , mid rounded back , and open unrounded .

This process is most frequent when a vowel is in contact with the phoneme , so that + vowel +  is the construction when the vowel is most frequently affected.

Morphology 

Mexican Spanish is a  form of the language (i.e. using  and its traditional verb forms for the familiar second person singular). The traditional familiar second person plural pronoun —in colloquial use only in Spain—is found in Mexico only in certain archaic texts and ceremonial language. However, since it is used in many Spanish-language Bibles throughout the country, most Mexicans are familiar with the form and understand it. An instance of it is found in the national anthem, which all Mexicans learn to sing: .

Mexicans tend to use the polite personal pronoun  in the majority of social situations, especially in Northern Mexico.

These same verb forms are also found in the traditional Spanish of northern New Mexico and southern Colorado.

Suffixes 

Central Mexico is noted for the frequent use of diminutive suffixes with many nouns, adverbs, and adjectives, even where no semantic diminution of size or intensity is implied. Most frequent is the  suffix, which replaces the final vowel on words that have one. Words ending with -n use the suffix . Use of the diminutive does not necessarily denote small size, but rather often implies an affectionate attitude; thus one may speak of "" ('a nice, big house').

When the diminutive suffix is applied to an adjective, often a near-equivalent idea can be expressed in English by "nice and [adjective]". So, for example, a mattress described as  might be "nice and soft", while calling it  might be heard to mean "too soft".

Eng. ) denoting affection.

Frequent use of the diminutive is found across all socioeconomic classes, but its "excessive" use is commonly associated with lower-class speech. 

The augmentative suffix  is typically used in Mexico to make nouns larger, more powerful, etc. For example, the word , in Mexico, means ; the suffixed form  means "big or long bus".

The word  ("wood") can take the suffix  to mean "rotten, ugly wood".

Nicknames 

This is common in, but not exclusive to, Mexican Spanish.

Syntax 

Typical of Mexican Spanish is an ellipsis of the negative particle  in a main clause introduced by an adverbial clause with :
 . (Until I took the pill, the pain did not go away.)

In this kind of construction, the main verb is implicitly understood as being negated.

Mexico shares with many other areas of Spanish America the use of interrogative  in conjunction with the quantifier :
  (How serious are the damages?) (Compare the form typical of Spain: "" (Is there a lot of damage?))
  (How good a cook are you?) (Compare Spain's "" (Are you a good cook?))

It has been suggested that there is influence of indigenous languages on the syntax of Mexican Spanish (as well as that of other areas in the Americas), manifested, for example, in the redundant use of verbal clitics, particularly . This is more common among bilinguals or in isolated rural areas.

 can be used colloquially in place of the superlative , as in:
  (That type of treatment is really expensive.)

Mexican Spanish, like that of many other parts of the Americas, prefers the preposition  in expressions of time spans, as in

A more or less recent phenomenon in the speech of central Mexico, having its apparent origin in the State of Mexico, is the use of negation in an unmarked yes/no question. Thus, in place of "" (Would you like...?), there is a tendency to ask "" (Wouldn't you like...?).

Lexicon
Mexican Spanish retains a number of words that are considered archaic in Spain.

Also, there are a number of words widely used in Mexico which have Nahuatl, Mayan or other native origins, in particular names for flora, fauna and toponyms. The latter include  "turkey" < Nahuatl   (although  is also used, as in other Spanish-speaking countries);  "kite" < Nahuatl   "butterfly"; and  "tomato" < Nahuatl  . For a more complete list see List of Spanish words of Nahuatl origin.

Other expressions that are common in colloquial Mexican Spanish include:

 : "soon; in a moment". Literally "right now". E.g. , "As soon as I finish (this)". Considered informal.
 : "fight" or "problem". Literally "aggressive woman or girl, or wild female animal". Commonly used among young people.
 :  "wild, untame". E.g. : "unpasteurized milk".
 : "bus"
 : darn.
 : cheap, of bad quality.
 ; ; : "a child, teen, or youngster". Considered informal.
 : "to check (verify)"
: "breast(s)". From Nahuatl  . Considered informal.
 : "cool, attractive, fun, etc."
 : "trash; crap". Considered vulgar.
 : In northern Mexico, equivalent to the English term gangsta; in the rest of Mexico, equivalent to the Spanish term  ("hooligan", "gang member"), which refers to young slum-dwellers living in conditions of extreme poverty, drug dependency, and malnutrition.
 : "peach"
 : "Just a minute", "Hold on a second", etc. Literally "in a moment".
 : "a bratty child" or "squirt". From Nahuatl  , "dog".
 : a filler word, similar to American English "um, uh". Literally, "this". Also used in other countries.
 : messed-up
 : a fair-haired or fair-skinned person. Derived from a term meaning "egg white".
 ,  or : "dude", "guy" (literally, "ox"). As an adjective, "dumb", "asinine", "moronic", etc. Not to be confused with "Huey" from the Aztec title "Huey Tlatoani", in which "Huey" is a term of reverence.
 : "to talk with (on the telephone)". Used in place of the standard .
 : "manly". Applied to a woman: "manly" or "skillful". From , male.
 : stuck up, arrogant. Considered vulgar.
 : dumb, foolish. Euphemistic in nature.
 : "a low-class, boorish, foolish, ignorant and/or uneducated person". Pejorative.
 : (1) similar to English "Wow!" (2) "Okay". (3) Exclamation of surprised protest. Abbreviated  by low-class people in their uneducated variety. May be considered rude.
 : used as an adjective to denote something "cool", attractive, good, fun, etc. E.g. , "This music is very cool." Literally, "father".
 : "problem" or "fight". Literally "fart". Also, in a greeting,  ("What's up, dude?"). As an adjective, "drunk", e.g. , "to be drunk". Also the noun : "a drunken gathering".
 : "curly hair". The word  derives from the Spanish word , "pig". Sometimes erroneously thought to be derived from Spanish , "Chinese".
 : "damned", "lousy", more akin to "freaking". E.g.  ("Take your lousy music from here"). As a noun, literally, "kitchen assistant". Considered vulgar.
 : "drinking straw". From Nahuatl  , the name of a plant from which brooms and drinking straws are made, or the straws themselves.
 : "to rent"
 : "What do you think about it?" Literally "How do you see it?"
 : An exclamation, used variously to express surprise, frustration, etc. From  ("son of a..."). Also .
 : "Beg your pardon?". From , "to order", formal command form. (literally "How?"), as in other countries, is also in use.
 : "What's up?". Literally, "What's the vibe?".
 : to be worthless. Literally "to be worth mother".

Most of the words above are considered informal (e.g. ,) and are limited to slang use among friends or in informal settings; foreigners need to exercise caution in their use. In 2009, at an audience for the signing of a Memorandum of Understanding between Mexico and the Netherlands, the then Crown Prince of the Netherlands, Willem-Alexander, made a statement to the audience with a word which, in Mexican Spanish, is considered very vulgar. Evidently oblivious to the word's different connotations in different countries, the prince's Argentine interpreter used the word  as the ending to the familiar Mexican proverb "" (A sleeping shrimp is carried away by the tide), without realizing the vulgarity associated with the word in Mexico. The prince, also unaware of the differences, proceeded to say the word, to the bemusement and offense of some of the attendees.

Similar dialects 

New Mexico Spanish has many similarities with an older version of Mexican Spanish, and can be considered part of a Mexican Spanish "macro-dialect".
The small amount of Spanish spoken in the Philippines has traditionally been influenced by Mexican Spanish, as the colony was initially administered from Mexico City before being administered directly from Madrid. Chavacano, a Spanish-based creole language in the Philippines, is based on Mexican Spanish. To outsiders, the accents of nearby Spanish-speaking countries in northern Central America, such as El Salvador and Guatemala, might sound similar to those spoken in Mexico, especially in central and southern Mexico.

Influence of Nahuatl 
The Spanish of Mexico has had various indigenous languages as a linguistic substrate. Particularly significant has been the influence of Nahuatl, especially in the lexicon. However, while in the vocabulary its influence is undeniable, it is hardly felt in the grammar field. In the lexicon, in addition to the words that originated from Mexico with which the Spanish language has been enriched, such as  "tomato,"  "rubber,"  "chalk,"  "chocolate,"  "coyote,"  "flask," et cetera; the Spanish of Mexico has many Nahuatlismos that confer a lexical personality of its own. It can happen that the Nahuatl word coexists with the Spanish word, as in the cases of  "buddy" and  "friend,"  "turkey" and  "turkey,"  "kid" and  "boy,"  "rope" and  "rope," etc. Other times, the Nahuatl word has almost completely displaced the Spanish,  "owl,"  "cornflour drink,"  "straw,"  "cornfield,"  "green bean,"  "shack,"  "kite," etc. The strength of the Nahuatl substrate influence is felt less each day, since there are no new contributions.

 Frequently used Nahuatlismos:  "avocado,"  "peanut,"  "cocoa,"  "coyote,"  "buddy,"  "chapulin,  "gum,"  "chocolate,"  "bean,"  "corn,"  "huachinango,"  "turkey,"  "rubber,"  "tomato,"  "Mayan (used for people of African descent),"  "rope,"  "cornfield,"  "corn husk,"  "kite,"  "flask" (per suitcase),  "goatee,"  "buzzard." 
 Moderately frequent Nahuatlismos:  "axolotl,"  "boob" (for female breast),  "shack, hut"  "youngest child,"  "owl,"  "street market,"  "hardware store,"  "grass." 
 Purépechismos or Tarasquismos:  "sandal,"  "poncho,"  "jerkin," ,"  "bundle of rags, (slang for suit)"  "salamander,"  . 
 Other non-Mexican indigenismos:  "flatbread corn,"  "armchair,"  "chief, headman,"  "alligator,"  "canoe,"  "coati,"  "hummingbird,"  "custard apple,"  "rags,"  "guava,"  "hurricane,"  "iguana,"  "jaguar,"  "crab,"  "jefen,"  "parrot,"  "agave,"  "corn,"  "mammee,"  "peanut,"  "yam,"  "rhea,"  "papaya,"  "canoe,"  "puma,"  "tobacco,"  "  "cassava."

English examples are –y in doggy or -let in booklet. It can also be cited as influence of Nahuatl the use of the suffix -Le to give an emphatic character to the imperative. For example:  "jump" ->  "jump,"  "eat" ->  "eat,"  "go/proceed" ->  "go/proceed," etc. This suffix is considered to be a crossover of the Spanish indirect object pronoun -le with the Nahua excitable interjections, such as  "strain." However, this suffix is not a real pronoun of indirect object, since it is still used in non-verbal constructions, such as  "son" ->  "damn,"  "now" ->   "wow,""" "what's up?" ->  "how's it going?," etc.

Although the suffix -le hypothesis as influence of Nahuatl has been widely questioned; Navarro Ibarra (2009) finds another explanation about -le intensifying character. The author warns that it is a defective dative clitic; instead of working as an indirect object pronoun, it modifies the verb. An effect of the modification is the intransitive of the transitive verbs that appear with this -le defective (ex.  "to move" it is not  "to move something for someone" but  "to make the action of moving"). This intensifier use is a particular grammatical feature of the Mexican Spanish variant. In any case, it should not be confused the use of -le as verbal modifier, with the different uses of the pronouns of indirect object (dative) in the classical Spanish, as these are thoroughly used to indicate in particular the case genitive and the ethical dative. In what is considered one of the founding documents of the Spanish language, the poem of Mio Cid written around the year 1200, you can already find various examples of dative possessive or ethical.

Influence of English 

Mexico has a border of more than 2,500 kilometers with the United States, and receives major influxes of American and Canadian tourists every year. More than 63% of the 57 million Latinos in the United States are assumed as of Mexican origin. English is the most studied foreign language in Mexico, and the third most spoken after Spanish and the native languages taken together. Given these circumstances, anglicisms in Mexican Spanish are continuously increasing (as they are also in the rest of the Americas and Spain), including  "to film",  "baseball",  "club",  "cocktail",  "leader",  "check",  "sandwich", etc.

The center of Hispanic Linguistics of UNAM carried out a number of surveys in the project of coordinated study of the cultured linguistic norms of major cities of Ibero-America and of the Iberian Peninsula. The total number of anglicisms was about 4% among Mexican speakers of urban norms. However, this figure includes anglicisms that permeated general Spanish long ago and which are not particular to Mexico, such as buffete,  "nylon",  "dollar", hockey,  "rum",  "railroad car",  "buffer", and others.

The results of this research are summarized as follows:

 Nouns are more likely to be loaned from English than other parts of speech. 
 Frequent Anglicisms: bar,  (for Bermuda shorts),  "beer", sport (type of clothing), switch. 
 Moderately used Anglicisms: barman "waiter", King/Queen size, grill, manager, penthouse, pullman, strapless,  or zipper.

Some examples of syntactic anglicisms, which coexist with the common variants, are:

 Using the verb apply/applying.
 Using the verb to assume with suppose.
 Using the verb access with access to.

See also 

 Languages of Mexico
 Standard Spanish
 List of colloquial expressions in Honduras

Notes

References

Further reading

External links 
 Jergas de habla hispana—A Spanish dictionary specializing in dialectal and colloquial variants of Spanish, featuring all Spanish-language countries including Mexico.
 Latin American Spanish—This is the universal and somewhat arbitrary name that is given to idiomatic and native expressions and to the specific vocabulary of the Spanish language in Latin America.
 Güey Spanish—Mexican slang dictionary and flashcards.
 Mexican Spanish slang—Several hundred words of Mexican slang and English meanings.

 
Spanish dialects of North America